Nick Vernier Band is an alias (and anagram) for productions by Dutch musician and record producer Eric Van Den Brink. Although a 'one man band' in essence, featured collaborators include Blondie Chaplin, Probyn Gregory, Gerry Beckley (with Jeffrey Foskett), Stephen John Kalinich, Paul Jones, David Paton, David Bullock, Matt Malley, Iain Matthews, Emitt Rhodes, Duncan Maitland, E.H. Roelfzema, Shandon Sahm, Janaki, and Iason Chronis, among others. Van Den Brink is also producer of Nick Vernier Band-mixes for Yoko Ono and Plastic Ono Band.

Recordings
The collective's recordings consist of original material, as well as songs by featured collaborators. Sound engineers include Julia Wolff, Hank Linderman, Bill Gautier, Dan Duskin, and Coen Berrier. Previous associations include recordings with Jan Akkerman, Rob Bolland, David Vermeulen, Colin Blunstone, Ian Gillan, and Herman Brood with Dick Dale, Hans Dulfer, Candy Dulfer, Jules Deelder, Nina Hagen, and Trijntje Oosterhuis. Related productions include Style Detectives, the first new Monkees-related release in over a decade (produced under license from Rhino Entertainment, featuring vocal samples from the band), Willem De Ridder, and Cosmo Police (with Atsuko Kurokawa).

Discography
(selection)
 Nick Vernier Band Addendum (EP) (2009)
 Iain Matthews Woodstock (Nick Vernier Band Mix) (single) (2009)
 Nick Vernier Band with Paul Jones I'm Your Kingpin (single) (2009)
 Nick Vernier Band Sessions (album) (2010)
 Yoko Ono Plastic Ono Band The Sun Is Down! (Nick Vernier Band Mix) (single) (2010)
 Nick Vernier Band feat. The Monkees Mister Bob (single) (2011)
 Nick Vernier Band feat. Janaki Agaraga (single) (2011)
 Nick Vernier Band Trainathought (single) (2012)
 Probyn Gregory & Nick Vernier Band I Send Up My Prayer (single) (2012)
 Gerry Beckley & Nick Vernier Band (with Jeffrey Foskett) Now Sue (single) (2012)
 Nick Vernier Band feat. David Paton Don't Know What To Say (single) (2013)
 Nick Vernier Band You Didn't Have To Be So Nice (single) (2014)
 Nick Vernier Band Hope (single) (2014)
 Nick Vernier Band On 42nd Street (single) (2015)
 Nick Vernier Band Autumn Mist (single) (2015)
 Nick Vernier Band feat. Laura Van Eeden Working Class Hero (single) (2015)
 Jera Ivory Don’t Give Up On Me (single) (2016)
 David Bullock Summers (single) (2017)
 Nick Vernier Band feat. Jera Ivory I Can't Stand The Rain (single) (2017)
 Scott Brookman with Nick Vernier Band Sitting In A House (single) (2018)
 Jera Ivory All Night Long (single) (2019)
 Nick Vernier Band feat. Shandon Sahm She's About A Mover (single) (2019)
 Shandon Sahm feat. Eric Van Den Brink Sahm Covers Sahm Vol. II (album) (2020)
 David Paton 2020 (album) (2020)

References

External links
Matt Malley
David Paton
Gerry Beckley
Probyn Gregory
Nick Vernier Band
Stephen John Kalinich

Musical collectives
Musical groups established in 2005
Musical groups from California
Remixers